Lejeune Hall (sometimes called the Lejeune Physical Education Center) is a sports complex and arena at the United States Naval Academy in Annapolis, Maryland. It currently houses the academy's boxing and wrestling practice arena, and natatorium, and the Naval Academy's Athletic Hall of Fame.

History
The Lejeune Hall was built in 1982 in honor of Lt. General John Archer Lejeune. The facility came with an aquatic natatorium which has an Olympic size pool (25m × 50m) and a diving well. The Natatorium also has a few diving boards. In 2013, the Lejeune Hall under went renovations where much of the flooring was redone and all the pools were also renovated with new tiles and new starting blocks.

Features
The Lejeune Hall features a weight room, saunas, locker rooms and a classroom. In the natatorium, features included are 600 pullout seats for spectators and a large LED display scoreboard. Visitors touring the campus will be able to see the natatorium through glass windows outside.

Memorials
The Lejeune Hall houses three memorials:
Class of 1940 Memorial – A fountain outside the building dedicated to the alumni of the academy who lost their lives in World War II.
Class of 1944 Memorial – A plaza and garden dedicated to the class of 1944.
Class of 1950 Memorial – A large stone to remember Isherwood Hall which had been demolished in 1958.

See also
Navy Midshipmen Facilities

References

External links
 Lejeune Hall Navy Sports official website

College swimming venues in the United States
Sports venues completed in 1982
Indoor arenas in Maryland
United States Naval Academy buildings and structures
1982 establishments in Maryland